The 1994 Amaroo Park ATCC round was the first round of the 1994 Australian Touring Car Championship. It was held on the weekend of 25 to 27 February at Amaroo Park in Sydney, New South Wales. This would be the last time the Australian Touring Car Championship would compete at Amaroo Park, whilst the circuit itself would close down just four years later. It was won by Mark Skaife, who took a clean sweep and took maximum points from the weekend.

Race results

Qualifying 
Mark Skaife took the first pole position of the year, with Glenn Seton just three-tenths slower.

Peter Jackson Dash 
Mark Skaife took out the Peter Jackson Dash with a commanding win - leading from the drop of the flag to the finish. Tomas Mezera was the big mover of the pack, moving from fifth place to second, thereby putting himself on the front row for race one. Meanwhile, Glenn Seton went from second to sixth, losing his front row start.

Race 1 
After Mezera was relegated to the back of the grid after being unable to get his engine started for the warm-up lap on time, Skaife was effectively given a free front-row. Using this to his advantage, he got off to an early lead and would keep it all the way to the flag for the first race win of the 1994 season. Down the pack, there were some drivers making moves. Glenn Seton would pass the Dick Johnson Racing duo of Bowe and Johnson and team-mate Alan Jones, who would later incur a puncture, effectively dropping him out of the race. Mezera would climb from 23rd to ninth in a stirring drive. Skaife took a convincing win, with Seton in second and Bowe in third.

Notes

1. – Mezera was relegated to the back of the grid after failing to start his engine on time for the warm-up lap.

Race 2 
In the final Australian Touring Car Championship race at Amaroo Park, Skaife took another flag-to-flag victory, in a relatively uneventful race. Although closer than the previous race, Skaife was never really challenged and walked away from the weekend with maximum points toward his assault on the 1994 season. The podium was completed by Seton and Brock.

Championship Standings 

Drivers' Championship standings

References

External links 

Amaroo Park